Gozo College Boys' Secondary School is a public school located Victoria, Gozo.

The school was founded in the 19th century. It always was a boys-only school, until 2016 when it became mixed. It is the largest school in Gozo.

References

External links 

 Gozo College Boys' Secondary School website

19th-century establishments in Europe
Schools in Malta
Secondary schools in Malta